Virginia's second congressional district is a U.S. congressional district in the Commonwealth of Virginia. It currently encompasses all of Accomack, Northampton, and Isle of Wight; all of the independent cities of Virginia Beach, Suffolk, and Franklin; part of the independent city of Chesapeake; and part of Southampton. However, its boundaries have changed greatly over the centuries; it initially encompassed what became West Virginia after the American Civil War. It is considered among the nation's most competitive congressional districts.

The district has a significant military presence. The Hampton Roads area is considered to be a military town.

Republican Scott Rigell defeated Democrat Glenn Nye in the November 2, 2010, election, and took his seat January 3, 2011, serving until 2017, when he was succeeded by Scott Taylor. In the November 6, 2018, election, Democrat Elaine Luria defeated Republican Scott Taylor. In 2022, Luria was defeated by Republican Jen Kiggans, thereby making the district one of 18 that voted for Joe Biden in the 2020 presidential election while being won or held by a Republican in 2022.

2020 redistricting
The responsibility of drawing maps for congressional and state legislative districts passed from the Virginia Redistricting Commission (VRC) to the Supreme Court of Virginia in November 2021. The Supreme Court completed redistricting in December 2021, which was used for the 2022 elections.

Recent results in statewide races 

Results Under Current Lines (Since 2023)

Results Under Old Lines

List of members representing the district

Election results

1980s

1990s

2000s

2010s

2020s

Historical district boundaries

See also

Virginia's congressional districts
List of United States congressional districts

References

 Congressional Biographical Directory of the United States 1774–present

02
Constituencies established in 1789
1789 establishments in Virginia
Constituencies disestablished in 1933
1933 disestablishments in Virginia
Constituencies established in 1935
1935 establishments in Virginia